The Shimen–Changsha railway or Shichang railway, is a double-track, electrified railroad in Hunan Province of southern China between Shimen and Changsha. The line connects Shimen, Yiyang and Changsha. The Shimen–Yiyang section forms part of the Luoyang–Zhanjiang railway Corridor.

Rail connections
Shimen: Jiaozuo–Liuzhou railway (to Liuzhou)
Changde: Qianjiang–Changde railway, Changde–Yiyang–Changsha high-speed railway
Yiyang: Luoyang–Zhanjiang railway
Changsha: Changsha–Zhuzhou–Xiangtan intercity railway (connection near Wushan railway station in Wangcheng District, Changsha), Beijing–Guangzhou railway

See also

 List of railways in China

References

Railway lines in China
Rail transport in Hunan